is a railway station in the town of Fusō, Aichi Prefecture,  Japan, operated by Meitetsu.

Lines

Station layout
The station has two opposed side platforms connected by an underpass. The platforms are of uneven length. The platform for Nagoya-bound trains is longer, and can handle trains of up to eight carriages in length, whereas the platform for Inuyama-bound trains is shorter, and can handle trains of only up to six carriages in length. The station is unattended.

Platforms

Adjacent stations

|-
!colspan=5|Nagoya Railroad

Station history
Kotsuyōsui Station was opened on August 6, 1912.  The station was closed in 1944, and reopened on November 18, 1952. It has been unattended since June 1974. A new station building was completed in January 2004.

Surrounding area
Toyobo Inuyama factory

See also
 List of Railway Stations in Japan

References

External links

 Official web page 

Railway stations in Japan opened in 1912
Railway stations in Aichi Prefecture
Stations of Nagoya Railroad
Fusō, Aichi